Tranquilino Garcete (1907–??) was a Paraguayan football midfielder who played for Paraguay in the 1930 FIFA World Cup. He also played for Club Libertad. In Argentina, he played in Atlanta (1932, 1933 and 1935), and the fusion Atlanta-Argentinos Juniors in 1934.

References

External links
FIFA profile

Paraguayan footballers
Paraguayan expatriate footballers
Paraguay international footballers
Association football midfielders
Club Libertad footballers
1930 FIFA World Cup players
Expatriate footballers in Argentina
Paraguayan expatriate sportspeople in Argentina
1907 births
Year of death missing